The Baltimore Ride were a United Women's Lacrosse League (UWLX) professional women's field lacrosse team based in Baltimore, Maryland.  They played in the UWLX since the 2016 season.  In the 2016 season, the four teams in the UWLX played in a barnstorming format, with all four teams playing at a single venue.

Franchise History
The Baltimore Ride was one of the original four teams of the United Women's Lacrosse League (MLL). UWLX was founded by Digit Murphy and Aronda Kirby in a strategic partnership with STX.  On February 23, 2016, Colleen Shearer was named as the first general manager in franchise history. On March 17, 2016, Jen Adams was announced as the Ride's first head coach. 

The first game in franchise history took place on May 28, 2016 at Goodman Stadium at Lehigh University in Bethlehem, Pennsylvania. Opposing the Long Island Storm, Baltimore lost by a 13–12 mark. The team's first-ever goal was scored by Beth Glaros, with Courtney Swan logging the assist. Glaros would finish the game with four goals to compile the first four-goal performance in franchise history.  

In the Ride’s second game, a 17–16 loss to the Boston Storm, Alex Aust set a league record and team record for most goals in a game. She would score a hat trick in the first and second half of the game, logging six goals overall.

Draft history
The following represented the Ride’s inaugural draft class. Of note, Katie Schwarzmann would be the first ever player selected in the history of the UWLX Draft, taken by the Ride with the top pick. Later in the draft, Dana Dobbie would be the first Canadian-born player selected in draft history.

Roster

See also
Women's Professional Lacrosse League
Major League Lacrosse, the professional men's field lacrosse league in North America
National Lacrosse League, the professional men's box lacrosse league in North America
List of professional sports teams in the United States and Canada

References

 

 

 
United Women's Lacrosse League
Women's lacrosse teams in the United States
2015 establishments in Maryland
Lacrosse clubs established in 2016
Lacrosse in Baltimore
Lacrosse teams in Maryland
Women's sports in Maryland